Knights is a 1993 American martial arts science fiction action film directed by Albert Pyun and starring kickboxing champion Kathy Long in her Hollywood debut. The film was released direct to home video in 1993.

Plot
The cyborg Gabriel (Kris Kristofferson) was created to destroy all other cyborgs. He later rescues Nea (Kathy Long) by killing the cyborg Simon (Scott Paulin). Gabriel trains Nea to become a cyborg killer and help him. They continue to kill cyborgs until Gabriel is torn in half by one of his targets and taken to the cyborg camp. Nea follows Jacob and challenges the cyborg leader Job (Lance Henriksen) to a fight. Finding Gabriel, she straps him to her back and they battle cyborgs until Gabriel can attach a dead cyborg's legs to himself. They pursue Job, but before they can catch him, the Master Builder captures Nea's brother, taking him to Cyborg City. During a battle, Job tells Gabriel that the cyborg population can't be stopped. Job dies moments later. Gabriel and Nea ride off in search of her brother.

Cast
 Kathy Long as Nea
 Casey Wallace as Young Nea
 Kris Kristofferson as Gabriel The Cyborg
 Lance Henriksen as Job The Cyborg
 Scott Paulin as Simon The Cyborg
 Gary Daniels as David The Cyborg
 Nicholas Guest as Farmer
 Vincent Klyn as Ty (Vince Klyn)
 Ben McCreary as Chance
 Jon H. Epstein as Matthew
 Blair Valk as Blu
 Brad Langenberg as Master Builder
 Clare Hoak as Mother
 Nancy Thurston as Woman Bandit
 Michael Halsey as Farmer Sitting At Campfire (uncredited)
 Tim Thomerson as Farmer Sitting At Campfire (uncredited)

Production

Filming
Parts of the film were shot in Utah at Monument Valley, the La Sal Mountains, Needles Overlook, Long Canyon, Professor Valley and a mushroom rock at Pucker Pass.

References

External links
 
 

1993 films
1993 independent films
1993 martial arts films
1990s science fiction action films
American robot films
American science fiction action films
American independent films
Films directed by Albert Pyun
Martial arts science fiction films
American martial arts films
Cyborg films
Films shot in Utah
Cyborg (film series)
1990s English-language films
1990s American films